Sunrise in Heaven is a 2019 American romance film directed by Waymon Boone and written by Dan Benamor. The film stars Caylee Cowan, Corbin Bernsen, Dee Wallace, Travis Burns, Erin Bethea, and Jenn Gotzon Chandler. It is based on the book, His Sunrise My Sunset, a 2016 romance novel by American author Jan Hurst. Hurst was inspired to write the faith-based book after the car crash that killed her husband, Steve.

Synopsis
The film is based on the life of Jan Hurst. Jan is the daughter of an overly protective militant father, but that doesn't stop her from falling in love with Steve, a young G.I. in the Air Force. The couple must find a way to win over her father so they may be married. In the future, a devastating car crash leaves her (now) husband on life support; she must keep faith in God as she faces the prospect of his passing. Recalling their courtship through flashbacks, she relives out the early days of their relationship.

Cast
 Caylee Cowan as Jan 
 Bonnie Burroughs as Adult Jan
 Travis Burns as Steve 
 Randy Crowder as Adult Steve
 Corbin Bernsen as Jim
 Dee Wallace as Marion 
 Erin Bethea as Michele
 Jenn Gotzon Chandler as Terri
 Connor McRaith as Robbie
 Aitana Rinab as Julie

Production
Written by Dan Benamor, Sunrise in Heaven was produced by Dureyshevar, Nat Mundel, Jack Nasser, Jacob Nasser and Joseph Nasser, and line produced by Bochen Zhang. A trailer for the film was released on February 6, 2019. It was released on April 9.

Filming
Filming began on June 25, 2018 in Los Angeles, California and was completed on July 10, 2018.

References

External links
 
 

2019 films
2019 romance films
American romance films
Films set in the 1950s
Films shot in Los Angeles
Films set in California
2010s American films